Azadlu (also Romanized as Āzādlū; also known as Azārlū and Azatlu) is a village in Azadlu Rural District, Muran District, Germi County, Ardabil Province, Iran. At the 2006 census, its population was 416, in 83 families.

References  

Towns and villages in Germi County